Living with the Enemy is an American reality television series that premiered on July 9, 2015 on Lifetime. The series chronicles two advocates with opposing views on a particular subject over an eight-day period; the first four days are spent at the home of the person who is in favor of the subject, while the last four days are spent at the home of the person who is against the subject.

Episodes

References

External links
 
 

2010s American reality television series
2015 American television series debuts
2015 American television series endings
English-language television shows
Lifetime (TV network) original programming